Robinson 2010 was the thirteenth season of the Swedish version of Survivor, and premiered on TV4 on 7 October 2010. Paolo Roberto returned as host for this season.

The filming took place between 23 May and June 2010 in the Philippines. The very first received applications from the channel's website were lost, due to an error in the form. In this season, Paolo Roberto handpicked the contestants in the final process of the casting in order to minimize drop-outs during the season.

Unlike previous seasons, this season didn't feature a jury vote to decide the winner. Instead, there was a final challenge in which Erik Svedberg won against Heléne Ekelund.

Contestants

The Total Votes is the number of votes a castaway has received during Tribal Councils where the castaway is eligible to be voted out of the game.

 Heléne, Margareta & Ozan were eliminated in a pre-season challenge. They were given a second chance, and were locked in a cage and moved to a lone beach. They was brought back into the game after the second Reward Challenge, in which Sarimanok chose Heléne & Ozan over fire, while Buwanga got the fire and Margareta.

 Misha wasn't picked in the first Reward Challenge, but joined Buwanga after they had won the first Immunity challenge.

 Josefin were Sarimanok's sacrifice in the second Immunity Challenge, in which they lost and Josefin was eliminated. She were given a second chance and was moved to another lone beach to start the new tribe Kalis.

 Buwanga had a Tribal Council at their beach; in which Elin were eliminated. Elin were later instructed to pick one contestant she thought was the least deserving player to win; she chose Misha, who was also eliminated. But as it later turned out, they were both moved to Kalis instead of having been eliminated from the competition.

 The remaining contestants in Sarimanok were merged with Buwanga; keeping Buwangas name and tribe color.

Results Overview
In the first episode, a race to the top of a hill decided who would be leader of each tribe. Leaders would get permanent immunity in their tribe. Daniel finished first and Erik finished second. It remained that way throughout the game. Daniel's tribe kept winning while Erik's tribe finished just behind. Even after the merge, Erik often finished second in challenges, often behind Daniel.
There were constant twists from beginning to end. For all sorts of reasons, players were moved back and forth between teams and locations. Step by step, a whole new team formed, which included both Daniel and Erik who lost their leadership positions in a challenge. The two of them formed a strong bond and their tribe came into the merge numerically superior. Daniel made a list of players from the other tribe which determined in which order they should be voted off. He tried to micromanage people. The other players found him overly bossy and most of his former tribe members turned against him. As a reaction against Daniel's alliance attempt, Helene, an older yet athletic woman, became puppet master of a four-person alliance. They stood against Daniel, Erik and their final remaining ally, Kristoffer. The remaining four players were free agents. They agreed to vote off Daniel as soon as he didn't win immunity. After that, Helene had complete grasp of the game. Players seemed afraid of her. If anyone heard any relevant information, they told her immediately. If she suspected anyone of gunning for her, she had them voted off. She became the godmother of the game.
Erik had a good relationship with Helene. He told her about Daniel's list, inviting her to their alliance, but he left out the fact that her name was fourth on the list, hoping to use her for three votes. She didn't take the bait but it seemed to make her trust him. Once Daniel was out, Erik expected to go next. However, Helene invited him to her alliance and used his vote to blindside her own alliance member, Mats. Thus, Erik found himself in the core alliance which held strong to the end. The free agents never tried to make moves. In the final eight, there was even a twist where four people were voted off one by one, showing in which order Helene's alliance were voting. The twist was however all for show and the four people who were voted out were not actually eliminated. Nevertheless, they all accepted their fate and were indeed voted off later, although in a different order. They never considered joining up to make it a four-on-four.
Elimination competitions began at final five. Mats became the fifth player by winning the return challenge, even defeating challenge beast Daniel. Helene and Erik won the two qualification challenges for the final. However, in yet another twist, Mats became the third finalist because he was the final five member with the most challenge wins throughout the game. Then, in a final twist, the jury didn't vote for a winner. Instead, they had to vote off one member and the remaining two battled it out in a multi-stage obstacle course. Mats was voted out and then Erik won the challenge against Helene.

In the case of multiple tribes or castaways who win reward or immunity, they are listed in order of finish, or alphabetically where it was a team effort; where one castaway won and invited others, the invitees are in brackets.

 Kinna received two extra votes against her (from the previous Tribal Council) in order to get a fire striker for her tribe, Sarimanok.

 The team leaders of Buwanga and Sarimanok (Daniel & Erik respectively) faced the men of Kalis (Kristoffer & Tommy). If they'd lost, they would be new members of Kalis.

 Kalis had the opportunity to save one contestant in Buwanga's Tribal Council from elimination. They chose Marcus.

 He/She were voted/eliminated out of the competition; but joined the new Charon tribe where only one contestant would come back later to the game.

 He/She came in last in the Immunity Challenge, and received one vote extra in the Tribal Council.

Episode Quotes
Translation of the original Swedish episode quotes and who that said it is listed here:
"If Paolo has the same demands on us as he has on himself, we will die..." – Ozan Kilic
"I can't believe I'm so stupid as to expose me for this fucking hell..." – Josefin Bergqvist
"It's a game. To some it is game over... as simple as that. Pack your bags and go home..." – Gökhan "Gurkan" Gasi
"I wouldn't say he's abnormal, but he isn't casted in the "Dalmas-shape" so to speak..." – Anders "Löken" Löfgren
"This is a 3-star resort so I enjoy it like a bear in an anthill..." – Peter Janeröd
"We feel no sympathy for the other team whatsoever... We don't like them at all!" – Mats Juhlin
"I'm no "skogsmulle". I'm no bloody jungle girl. But what the hell, I aren't an idiot just because of that." – Magdalena "Maggie" Divina
"Yeah but... How stupid can you be? He's toast..." – Heléne Ekelund
"Honestly... That was the dumbest thing we or I have ever done during Robinson" – Mats Juhlin
"I've said it a thousand times. Do not betray me or else..." – Heléne Ekelund
"You got to have some damn balls... and stand up for your cause..." – Marcus Metsomäki
"If I should survive myself, I might have to lie right to someone's face..." – Erik Svedberg
"Goooooooooo" – Paolo Roberto

Voting history

External links
http://www.tv4.se/robinson

 2010
2010 Swedish television seasons